Mells  may refer to:

 Mells, Somerset, England, UK
 Mells, Suffolk, England, UK
 Meols, The Wirral, England, UK (identical pronunciation i.e. )

See also

 
 Mell (disambiguation)
 Mel's (disambiguation)
 Mels